Teresa Henry is an American politician and a former Democratic member of the Montana House of Representatives, who represented District 96 from 2004 to 2011.

External links
Montana House of Representatives - Teresa Henry official MT State Legislature website
Teresa K. Henry official campaign website

Members of the Montana House of Representatives
1952 births
Living people
Women state legislators in Montana
University of California, San Francisco alumni
21st-century American women politicians
21st-century American politicians